The  is an art museum in Tokyo, Japan. It is one of Japan's many museums which are supported by a prefectural government. The current structure, designed by Kunio Maekawa, was completed in 1975.

The museum is located in Ueno Park.

Access
        Ueno Station (with JR East and Tokyo Metro)
   Uguisudani Station (with JR East)
  Keisei Ueno Station (with Keisei Electric Railway)

See also
Tokyo Metropolitan Teien Art Museum

References

External links

Tokyo Metropolitan Art Museum
Access Map

Art museums and galleries in Tokyo
Ueno Park
Buildings and structures in Taitō